Jemez Canyon Dam (National ID # NM00003) is a dam in Sandoval County, New Mexico, a few miles north of Albuquerque.

The earthen dam was constructed in 1953 by the United States Army Corps of Engineers, with a height of 150 feet and a length at its crest of 870 feet.  It impounds the Jemez River for flood control and storm water management in the spring and early summer seasons.  The dam is owned by the Corps of Engineers, and operated by the Corps and the Cochiti Lake Project Office.

The reservoir it creates, Jemez Canyon Reservoir, has a normal water surface of 2.2 square miles and a maximum capacity of 264,700 acre-feet.  Normal storage is about one tenth that volume.  Recreation is limited.  There is no access to the water.  All land surrounding the reservoir, except a small day-use area with picnic facilities and a scenic overlook, is the property of Santa Ana Pueblo, with restricted access.

References 

Dams in New Mexico
Dams in the Rio Grande basin
Reservoirs in New Mexico
Dams completed in 1953
Buildings and structures in Bernalillo County, New Mexico
Bodies of water of Bernalillo County, New Mexico
United States Army Corps of Engineers dams
1953 establishments in New Mexico